Arnold James McCallum (April 23, 1931 – May 25, 2008) was a former territorial level politician. He served as a member of the Northwest Territories legislature  from 1975 until 1987.

McCallum was first elected to the Northwest Territories Legislature in the 1975 Northwest Territories general election, winning the new Slave River electoral district. He was re-elected to a second term in the 1979 Northwest Territories general election. In his second term McCallum became the first Minister of the Northwest Territories Housing Corporation in 1982. He served that portfolio until 1983. He ran for his third and final term in the 1983 Northwest Territories general election. He served out his final term and did not return when the legislature was dissolved in 1987.

He died peacefully in 2008.

References

External links

1931 births
2008 deaths
Members of the Legislative Assembly of the Northwest Territories
People from Charlottetown
People from Yellowknife